Vladimir Landsman (born 21 December 1941 in Dushanbe) is a Soviet-Canadian violinist and teacher.

Biography
Vladimir Landsman started to play violin at the age of five. At the age 12, following David Oistrakh's advise, he had entered the Moscow Central Music School where he studied under Yuri Yankelevich. He then studied for four years at the Merzlyakovsky College, before entering the Moscow Conservatory, where he earned an Aspirantura diploma. He became a soloist member of the Moscow Philharmonic Society, and performed with such renowned conductors as Gennady Rozhdestvensky and Evgeny Svetlanov. In 1963 he won 3rd prize in Long-Thibaud Competition in Paris, and in 1966 he became a 1st prize winner at the Montreal International Music Competition, and since enjoyed an international career as a soloist, performing frequently throughout the world. In 1973 he emigrated to Israel, and shortly thereafter to Canada, of which he became a naturalized citizen in 1981. Since 1975, Landsman has taught at the Music Faculty of the University of Montreal, where he is currently an associate professor.

References 

Soviet emigrants to Canada
Academic staff of the Université de Montréal
1941 births
Soviet violinists
20th-century violinists
Male violinists
People from Dushanbe
Living people
21st-century violinists
20th-century male musicians
21st-century male musicians